Carrols Restaurant Group is an American franchisee company and is the largest Burger King franchisee in the world; Carrols owns and operates over 1,000+ Burger Kings, and 55 Popeyes restaurants. The company has operated Burger Kings since 1976 in locations across 23 U.S. states. 
The company formerly owned the restaurant chains Pollo Tropical, Taco Cabana, and Carrols.
The original Carrols chain ceased operations in the United States in the mid-1970s. The last unaffiliated Carrols Restaurants existed in Finland. The chain was eventually bought out by another Finnish fast-food chain, Hesburger. In 2012, Hesburger announced that the brand Carrols would be discontinued, and on the 29th of May, 2012, the last Carrols (in Oulunkylä) was renamed Hesburger.

History
An offshoot of the Tastee-Freez company, Carrols was named after the Tastee-Freez co-owner Leo Marantz's daughter, Carol.

Herb Slotnick bought the franchise rights for the New York area and started opening restaurants in the Syracuse, New York, area in the early 1960s. They expanded over the years throughout New York State. During the 1960s, a yellow slug character served as Carrols' first mascot, replaced in 1974 by a young blonde boy wearing a tweed suit and a Fedora hat.

Most Carrols restaurant locations were converted to Burger King franchises in 1975, with less profitable stores shuttered. After the conversion, the Carrols brand was only found overseas in Finland, Sweden, Estonia, Latvia and Russia -- except for two stores: one on Roosevelt Avenue in Carteret, New Jersey, which closed in the late 1970s; and a single franchisee-owned store in Batavia, New York. Both of these latter two stores operated under the Carrols name into the 1980s, before closing.

The Finnish group Carrols opened up several locations in St Petersburg, Russia in the mid-to-late 1990s. In 1998 it opened its first operation in Moscow located at the then-new Ohotni Riad Mall. Because of the 1998 Russian financial crisis, the operations did not generate enough sales for Carrols, and by 2000 all Carrols outlets in Russia had been closed.

The Finnish restaurant company Hesburger started to buy out the last existing Carrols locations in Helsinki, Finland in the mid-2000s.

On December 9, 2005, Carrols Holdings and Mimi's Café was filed for offerings.

In February 2011 the company announced it was divesting itself of its two Central American-themed chains, Taco Cabana and Pollo Tropical, in a spin-off aimed at helping the company focus on its core Burger King operations. The sale of the two chains, collectively called the Fiesta Restaurant Group, was completed in May 2012.

On February 20, 2019, Nation's Restaurant News reported that Carrols is to merge with Cambridge Franchise Holdings LLC in a deal worth 238 million dollars, which adds 55 Popeyes and 166 Burger Kings to Carrols' portfolio. Those restaurants will be in the southern United States "structured as a tax-free merger". Carrols will give Cambridge around 7.36 million common shares. Also included in the deal, Cambridge will get 9% of Carrols preferred stock.

On February 22, 2022, Nation's Restaurant News reported that Carrols has named a new CEO, former McDonald's executive Paulo Pena, effective April 1, 2022. Then-current CEO Dan Accordino will retire.

Burger King 
In June 2012, Carrols acquired 278 Burger King locations from Burger King for approximately $150 million. In exchange, the Burger King parent, Burger King Corporation took a 28.9% stake in the company. The transaction involved a line of credit that would be used by Carrols to renovate more than 450 of its stores.

Theaters
Beginning in the early 1970s, Carrols owned and operated the CinemaNational movie theater chain, until their sale to Mid-States Theaters and USA Cinemas in the early and mid-1980s. The theaters were concentrated in central New York State, but there were locations as far away as Wisconsin, Idaho and California. The chain consisted mostly of large single-screen locations that had been purchased from companies like Kallet, Hallmark and Dipson Theaters, along with new locations that were built by Slotnick. CinemaNational also built some triple-screen multiplex locations in sites like the Penn-Can Mall in Cicero, New York, and the Fayetteville Mall in Fayetteville and Evansville Indiana.

References

External links
 Official site

Burger King
Companies based in Syracuse, New York
Restaurants established in 1960
Defunct restaurant chains in the United States
Restaurants in New York (state)